Harish Chandra Sarin (1914–1997) was an Indian civil servant, writer and the defence secretary of India. He assumed office on 3 November 1968 and held the position until 7 December 1970. He was the author of the book, Defence and Development.

Sarin was born on 27 May 1914 at Deoria in the Indian state of Uttar Pradesh and was an alumnus of Cambridge University. He held the position of the Defence Secretary past his retirement age. Sarin, who was married to Pushpa Rathore, died on 27 January 1997. The Government of India awarded him Padma Vibhushan, the second highest Indian civilian award, in 1967. He was also a recipient of the First Special IMF Award of the Indian Mountaineering Foundation in 1993.

See also

 K.B. Lall
 P. V. R. Rao

References

Recipients of the Padma Vibhushan in civil service
Indian civil servants
Writers from Uttar Pradesh
1914 births
1997 deaths
People from Deoria, Uttar Pradesh